CCEP may refer to:
Coca-Cola Europacific Partners, a British bottling company
Coordinating Committee for Earthquake Prediction, a Japanese organisation
Canadian Center for Emergency Preparedness, a Canadian non-profit organisation which ceased operations in 2014
 (CCeP), a 19th-century Portuguese railway company
Center for Community Earthquake Preparedness, University of Mississippi School of Engineering, United States
Centre for Climate Economics and Policy at the Australian National University Crawford School of Public Policy
Certified Chiropractic Extremity Practitioner, a chiropractic credential
Corporate Compliance & Ethics Professional, a certification for campus privacy officers
C.C.E.P, a 1991 single by Sweet Exorcist